Guillermo 'Guille' Roldán Méndez (born 23 June 1981 in Córdoba, Andalusia) is a Spanish footballer who plays for Gibraltarian club Europa F.C. as a winger.

References

External links

1981 births
Living people
Footballers from Córdoba, Spain
Spanish footballers
Association football wingers
Segunda División players
Segunda División B players
Tercera División players
Córdoba CF B players
Córdoba CF players
Lucena CF players
CD Guadalajara (Spain) footballers
Albacete Balompié players
UD Melilla footballers
CD Alcoyano footballers
SD Eibar footballers
Gibraltar Premier Division players
Europa F.C. players
Spanish expatriate footballers
Expatriate footballers in Gibraltar
Spanish expatriate sportspeople in Gibraltar